Shanti Nilayam is a 1969 Indian Tamil-language film, produced and directed by G. S. Mani. It stars Gemini Ganesan and Kanchana, with Nagesh, Vijaya Lalitha, Pandari Bai, K. Balaji and V. S. Raghavan in supporting roles. The film won the National Film Award for Best Cinematography for Marcus Bartley. It is a remake of the 1968 Kannada film Bedi Bandavalu which was inspired by the 1847 novel Jane Eyre by Charlotte Brontë.

Plot 
Malathi, after losing her parents, lives with her aunt who tortures and treats her like a servant. One day she is dumped in a waste materials facility and she falls sick. Doctor Vijayan, who comes to treat her, sympathises and admits her in a private school-cum-hostel for orphans. Malathi grows up into a young lady and becomes a teacher in the same school.

Baskar, a rich estate owner, lives in Shanthi Nilayam with his older brother Sekar's children (four daughters and a son) and is finding it difficult to bring them up as they are very naughty and the hired governess runs away every time. His cousin Ramu and his mother live in the estate too. Baskar conveys his need to Dr. Vijayan who convinces Malathi to accept the governess job. Initially, the children do not accept Malathi, but her understanding and matured nature soon wins them over. Baskar appreciates her work.

Strange things happen in the house: Pappamma, the servant maid laughs and walks at midnight with a candle, Balu visits Baskar regularly for money. Malathi suspects something wrong in the house. She learns that one of the children, Geetha, an innocent loves Ramu. One night Baskar's coat catches fire and Malathi douses it. She demands to know why Baskar looks like he has lost something, but he does not reply. Balu comes again and Baskar gives him money and tells him that he will not give him any more.

Baskar's family friend, Parvatham arrives with her husband and daughter Sheela. Parvatham suggests the marriage of Baskar and Sheela and Malathi is upset hearing this. Malathi's aunt, with her daughters Saradha and Sumathi, arrives there after having fallen in their lives. Ramu's mother accepts them and they stay with Malathi. Sheela and her mother treat Malathi and her relatives badly. They spread rumours about Malathi, and Baskar shouts at Malathi to behave properly like an educated person. Malathi feels that even Baskar is treating her like a servant and decides to leave the house. However, Ramu stops her and states the children's needs and she stays back. Baskar understands Malathi's commitment to the family and expresses his love for her. Sheela overhears this and shouts at Malathi for snatching away Baskar. Baskar asks Sheela and her family to leave. The children are happy about Malathi and Baskar uniting. Baskar schedules their wedding for the following Friday. One day, Malathi sees Balu with bloodstains and demands an explanation from Baskar who promises to reveal everything soon.

During the marriage proceeding, Balu arrives and states that Baskar has already married his sister. Baskar accepts and reveals that he indeed married Janaki, a mad woman and explains the circumstances of the marriage. Baskar's father in an altercation, hit Singaram, Balu's father, leading to his death. Balu blackmails Baskar's father to marry his sister to Bhaskar and give a part of the wealth to her. Baskar's father refuses, but Baskar, to save the family's prestige, agrees and marries Janaki, but finds her totally mad. He gives her the best medical treatment, but there is no improvement in Janaki. Pappamma cares for her. Baskar's brother Sekar was killed in a fire lit by Janaki. Ramu's mother confirms the facts and  Malathi is shocked and leaves home. The children cry for her to stay and Kavitha, one of them, follows her. Kavitha falls down unconscious and Malathi stops and returns home along with Dr. Vijayan, who arrives there.

Meanwhile, Balu demands Baskar to transfer the wealth belonging to Janaki to him and threatens to kill him otherwise. Baskar takes him on and beats him. At the same time, Janaki comes out of her room and puts the house on fire. Balu, Janaki and Pappamma die in the fire. Malathi, Ramu and Dr. Vijayan arrive and save everybody. Baskar and Malathi marry.

Cast 
Gemini Ganesan as Bhaskar
Kanchana as Malathi
Vijaya Lalitha as Sheela
Nagesh as Ramu
K. Balaji as Balu
Pandari Bai as Ramu's mother
V. S. Raghavan as Bhaskar's father
Vijaya Chandrika as Janaki
Leela as Paapamma
Rama Prabha as Geetha
Manjula Vijayakumar as Bhaskar's niece

Production 

Shanthi Nilayam was a remake of the Kannada film Bedi Bandavalu (1968). S. S. Vasan saw the Kannada film and bought the remake rights for it. He assigned Chitralaya Gopu to write the screenplay and dialogues for the Tamil version. Although Vasan liked the screenplay, he felt that the film would not cater to the rural audience. Gopu, in turn, felt that Vasan's doubts would be overcome with Nagesh's comic potential. Vasan's words however proved to be true as the film ran well only in cities and not so much in smaller towns. G. S. Mani, son-in-law of Vasan made his directorial debut with this film.

Gopu's recommendation of Kanchana for the lead role was agreed to by the film's director Mani. The film was entirely shot at Ooty and art director Mohana Kumari was in charge of erecting the special sets required to shoot the film's scenes. The flying helium balloon in the song "Bhoomiyil Iruppadhu" was one of the highlights. Camera techniques were used in the song to show that the balloon was flying, while in reality it was not.

Influences 
According to film historian Randor Guy, Shanti Nilayam, though widely believed to have been adapted from The Sound of Music, was actually based on Charlotte Brontë's novel Jane Eyre.

Soundtrack 
The soundtrack was composed by M. S. Viswanathan, with lyrics by Kannadasan. S. P. Balasubrahmanyam made his debut in Tamil cinema with this film by singing the song "Iyarkai Ennum", even though Adimai Penn (which he signed after Shanti Nilayam) was released first.

References

Bibliography

External links 

1960s Tamil-language films
1969 films
Films based on Jane Eyre
Films based on works by Charlotte Brontë
Films scored by M. S. Viswanathan
Films whose cinematographer won the Best Cinematography National Film Award
Films with screenplays by Chitralaya Gopu
Tamil remakes of Kannada films
1969 directorial debut films